Bądków  is a village in the administrative district of Gmina Zgierz, within Zgierz County, Łódź Voivodeship, in central Poland.

The village has a population of 126.

Massacre during Second World War

During the German Invasion of Poland in 1939, German forces mass murdered 22 Poles by burning them alive. The victims included three elderly people (up to 90 years old) and one child. The Poles were imprisoned in a barn that was set on fire. Those who tried to escape from the fire were shot by the Germans during the escape attempt (see Nazi crimes against the Polish nation). In 1941, the occupiers also carried out expulsions of Poles, who were deported to forced labour in Germany, while their houses and farms were handed over to German colonists as part of the Lebensraum policy.

References

Villages in Zgierz County
Massacres in Poland
Germany–Poland relations
Massacres of Poles
Nazi war crimes in Poland